JBS may refer to:

Schools
 John Burroughs School, in Ladue, Missouri, United States
 Judge Business School, at Cambridge University
 June Buchanan School, in Pippa Passes, Kentucky, United States
 John Bosco School, former name of De La Salle John Bosco College
 JBS, an abbreviation for Lycée Jean-Baptiste-Say (JBS Lyceum), Paris

Groups, organizations, companies
 Japan Bible Society
 JBS S.A., a Brazilian meat processor operating worldwide 
 JBS USA, its U.S. subsidiary
 Jewish Broadcasting Service, an American broadcaster
 Johanson–Blizzard syndrome
 John Birch Society

Other uses
 Jubilee Bus Station, in Secunderabad, Telangana, India
 John Bendor-Samuel (1929–2011), a British missionary linguist
 Journal of British Studies
 Journey Beyond Sodor, a 2017 Thomas & Friends film

See also

 JB (disambiguation)
 JB's (disambiguation)